José Maria Larocca Jr. (born 1 January 1969) is an Argentinian equestrian. His discipline is show jumping, usually individually. Larocca currently ranks two hundred and seventy-sixth on the FEI Rolex Ranking List.

Larocca was a relatively late starter to competitive equestrianism, beginning his show-jumping career at age thirty-four. Larocca had ridden horses between the ages of three and twenty but left Argentina for Europe to focus on other forms of work until his love of horses returned him to the sport. His first major competition was in 2008, the Lyon Grand Prix, and when he completed the course with no faults, he was inspired to continue. Larocca has appeared twice in the FEI World Equestrian Games and twice in the Summer Olympic Games representing Argentina.

Larocca received media attention when he purchased the horse Okidoki for unspecified millions with the intent of riding him in the 2012 Summer Olympics. Okidoki suffered a hamstring injury during an event in Cannes in 2010, which initially appeared to be treated successfully, but developed septic shock from surgical complications.

Biography 
Larocca was born in Wettingen, Switzerland, on 1 January 1969. He began riding at the age of three and rode in Argentina until the age of twenty. At that age, he moved back to Europe to concentrate on other forms of work.

Larocca began riding again in 2003 at the age of thirty-four after being unable to forget his love of horses. In 2008, Larocca completed the Lyon Grand Prix with no jumping faults, making him believe he could compete at the highest level of equestrianism. In 2009, Larocca came in third at the Zurich Grand Prix, sixth at the Valencia Grand Prix, and sixth at the Patrignano Grand Prix. In 2011, Larocca came in fourth at the Frankfurt Grand Prix, and in 2012 he came in sixth at the Valkenswaard Grand Prix.

Larocca has competed twice in the FEI World Equestrian Games. He first competed in the 2006 FEI World Equestrian Games for both individual and team on his horse Svante; in individual, he came in seventy-third, and he was part of the seventeenth-ranking team. He then competed in the 2010 FEI World Equestrian Games for both individual and team on his horse Con Air 7; in individual he came in forty-first, and he was part of the twenty-seventh-ranking team. Every time he was competing for Argentina.

On two occasions, Larocca has competed in individual jumping at the Summer Olympic Games. First, in 2008, Larocca came in fifty-eighth, not passing the second qualifier. Larocca tried again in 2012 and came in thirty-eighth, not passing the third qualifier. Both times, Larocca represented Argentina and rode on the horse Royal Power.

Personal life 
Larocca has said that his greatest inspiration is his optimistic father, and Larocca's personal motto is "Always believe in yourself."

Horses 

Larocca purchased the horse Okidoki for unspecified millions with the intention of riding him in the 2012 Olympics. The horse was already known as the mount of Albert Zoer of the Netherlands, who won team gold at the 2006 FEI World Equestrian Games, the 2007 European Championships, and the 2007 Olympia Grand Prix in London. However, after Okidoki injured a hamstring during an event in Cannes, he developed complications from surgery and died in late July 2010 of septic shock in the abdomen despite initially being proclaimed "well" shortly after the hamstring surgery. As a result of the loss of Okidoki, Larocca instead rode Royal Power at the Olympics.

See also
Global Champions Tour
Trafigura – About Us

References

External links
 
 
 
 
 
 

1969 births
Living people
Argentine male equestrians
Olympic equestrians of Argentina
Equestrians at the 2008 Summer Olympics
Equestrians at the 2012 Summer Olympics
Equestrians at the 2016 Summer Olympics
Equestrians at the 2020 Summer Olympics
Pan American Games silver medalists for Argentina
Pan American Games medalists in equestrian
Equestrians at the 2011 Pan American Games
Equestrians at the 2015 Pan American Games
Equestrians at the 2019 Pan American Games
Medalists at the 2015 Pan American Games
Medalists at the 2019 Pan American Games
People from Baden District, Aargau